Kafr Khasher is a village in northern Aleppo Governorate, northwestern Syria. The Baghdad Railway passes by.

The village administratively belongs to Nahiya Azaz in Azaz District. Nearby localities include Kafr Kalbin  to the east, and Menagh  to the southwest. In the 2004 census, Kafr Khasher had a population of 246.

References

Populated places in Azaz District
Villages in Aleppo Governorate